Adeodato López (1 February 1906 – 4 May 1957) was a Mexican footballer. He was part of Mexico's squad at the 1928 Summer Olympics in the Netherlands, but he did not play in any matches.

Career statistics

International

International goals
Scores and results list Mexico's goal tally first.

References

1906 births
1957 deaths
Mexican footballers
Association football forwards
Footballers at the 1928 Summer Olympics
Olympic footballers of Mexico
Club América footballers